The Resistance was a Swedish death metal band formed in 2011 by former members of In Flames, Grave, and The Haunted. Their music is described as old-school death metal with the aggressive elements of 1980s thrash and hardcore.

The band had problems getting a label, despite the members' successful work in their earlier projects. In an interview with Close Up, they stated that the labels were unwilling to sign the band without getting hand on an actual recording. The first full-length album named Scars was released in 2013. "It makes you want to kick in someone's forehead when listening to the album", according to Jesper Strömblad, the band's guitarist. The first planned album was cancelled, since the band members were not satisfied with the result.

On 17 May 2016, a 'game over' profile picture appeared on their Facebook page, signalling the band has ceased all activities. On 22 July 2016, their Facebook presence was removed, further indicating the band are no longer together. No official announcement has been made regarding the status of the band.

Discography
Studio albums
 Scars (2013)
 Coup de Grâce (2016)

EPs
 Rise from Treason (2013)
 Torture Tactics (2015)

Line-up

Final line-up
 Marco Aro – vocals (2011–2016)
 Christofer Barkensjö – drums (2011–2016)
 Rob Hakemo – bass (2014–2016)
 Daniel Antonsson – guitars (2015–2016)

Former members
 Jesper Strömblad – guitars (2011–2016)
 Glenn Ljungström – guitars (2011–2015)
 Alex Losbäck Holstad – bass (2011–2012)
 Claudio Oyarzo – bass (2013–2014, live 2012–2013)

External links
 Facebook page
 Band page at earMUSIC
 HornsUp Booking Agency

References

Musical groups from Gothenburg
Musical groups established in 2011
Swedish death metal musical groups
2011 establishments in Sweden